Moncef Chérif (born 8 November 1940) is a Tunisian former footballer who played for Stade Tunisien and the Tunisian national team.

References

External links
 

1940 births
Living people
People from Gabès
Tunisian footballers
Tunisia international footballers
Olympic footballers of Tunisia
Footballers at the 1960 Summer Olympics
1962 African Cup of Nations players
Stade Tunisien players
Association football forwards